Henry Danger is an American comedy television series created by Dan Schneider and Dana Olsen that aired on Nickelodeon from July 26, 2014 to March 21, 2020. While Danger Force is developed by Christpher J. nowak based on the characters by Schneider and Olsen that premiered on Nickelodeon on March 28, 2020. Henry Danger stars Jace Norman, Cooper Barnes, Riele Downs, Sean Ryan Fox, Ella Anderson, and Michael D. Cohen and Danger Force stars Cooper Barnes and Michael D. Cohen, Havan Flores, Terrence Little Gardenhigh, Dana Heath, and Luca Luhan. Included in this list are the characters that appear in the Henry Danger animated spinoff, The Adventures of Kid Danger.

Main

Henry Hart / Kid Danger 
 (Jace Norman) is a 13-year-old boy who becomes the sidekick of Captain Man. He is an average kid with friends and has an after school job as Captain Man's superhero sidekick. Thanks to his skills and gadgets, Kid Danger has no problem helping Captain Man on his missions. He will always be with his friends even if he has to go save the world. In "Hour of Power", Henry gains super-fast reflexes during the fight against Captain Man's former sidekick Drex. He received this power after he breathed the fumes of a foreign lizard and a black shag spider. Later, it was named Hyper-Motility. In "Part 3: A New Hero", he loses his powers by touching the antivirus while using it to stop the virus and save the world and the Internet. Henry quits his job in the episode, “The Beginning of the End.” In, “The Fate of Danger: Part 2”, Henry gets a new super power, being able to create a green glowing force field around his body that is able to repel objects. This enabled him to fake Kid Danger's death. In the same episode, Henry, Charlotte and Jasper leave Swellview, and fight crime in the next town over, Dystopia.

Ray Manchester / Captain Man 
 (Cooper Barnes) is a superhero who trains Henry. About 25 years ago, Ray Manchester's scientist father Dr. Carl Manchester accidentally pulled a lever on his Trans-Molecular Densitizer that Ray crashed into when riding his skateboard causing him to be indestructible and yet can still feel some pain for a short time. Now he is a crime-fighting superhero. He needed a sidekick, so he chose Henry. Captain Man's Man-Cave is located underneath "Junk 'n' Stuff". Ray is shown to have a crush on Mrs. Hart despite the fact that she is married, which sometimes irritates Henry and he tries to force Ray to go do something else for the time being. He owns the Man Copter and Man Van. Kale Culley portrays a younger version of him in "Back to the Danger: Part 2". In, “The Fate of Danger: Part 2”, Ray and Schwoz open the Swellview Academy for the Gifted or SW.A.G. for short, with Ray leading and training a young group of new superheroes.

Charlotte 
 (Riele Downs) is one of Henry's best friends. She is sarcastic, clever, and smart. She is the "sass master" of the bunch, always there to snap everyone back to reality. She and Henry have been best friends for a long time and therefore she is close enough to him to tell it like it is. She is a big fan of Captain Man. In the fourth episode, Charlotte figures out Henry's secret and gets a job as an Information Assistant for Captain Man and Kid Danger. In, “The Fate of Danger: Part 2”, Charlotte leaves Swellview with Henry and Jasper to fight crime in the next town over, Dystopia, showing that she has become a cyborg.

Jasper Dunlop 
 (Sean Ryan Fox) is one of Henry's best friends. He is full of ideas, but most of them are not good. He has been Henry's best friend since preschool. He is a bucket collector which always embarrasses Henry and Charlotte. He also asks a lot of questions and is a big fan of Captain Man as well. In the episode "I Know Your Secret", Henry reveals to Jasper that he is Kid Danger, and is taken into the business. In “The Fate of Danger: Part 1”, Jasper was having the ability of Esperanto Sleep Fighting and also speaking Spanish, while fighting the cavemen army. In, “The Fate of Danger: Part 2”, Jasper leaves Swellview with Henry and Charlotte to fight crime in the next town over, Dystopia.

Piper Hart 
 (Ella Anderson) is Henry's little sister who is a fan of Captain Man. She and Henry are not that close. Piper claims that she hates her life and overreacts to various issues mostly about social media. She is fearless and even aggressive, but does have a softer side. Piper is also shown to be annoyed with Jasper's antics and seems to have a big rivalry with him. In the episode Grave Danger, due to an accidental technicality at the DMV, Piper has her own driver's license despite being underage. She later discovered her brother's secret in part one of “Sister Twister” and screamed after seeing them transform into the heroes. She would play a part in becoming a member of the team after she helped Ray get his memory back (as he was about erase Piper's, but she accidentally aimed the device at him instead), despite Henry's reluctance. In “A Tale of Two Pipers” it is revealed that Piper will become a leader of a resistance group (against cyborg children) in the future and that both Henry and Ray trained her. In "The Fate of Danger" Pt. 2, Piper goes to attend college in Florida.

Schwoz 
Schwoz Schwartz (Michael D. Cohen) is Captain Man's worker and closest friend, who handled the equipment in the Man Cave as he was the one who built it. Ray and Schwoz's friendship was strained when Schwoz stole Ray's girlfriend. They eventually made up when Henry convinced Ray to forgive Schwoz. Since then, Schwoz has come up with various inventions to help Captain Man and Kid Danger, though at times he can be weird and funny, which makes Henry and Ray furious. He sometimes refers to his sister as someone who looks like a horse. Schwoz is highly intelligent with extensive knowledge in Engineering, Mechanics, Computer science and Medicine. He also had a shape-shifting android as his "girlfriend" and in “Grand Theft Otto”, it's revealed that Schwoz had cloned himself. He becomes a main character in the fifth season. In “The Fate of Danger: Part 2”, he and Ray open The Swellview Academy for the Gifted, or SW.A.G. for short, helping Ray train a new team of Superheroes.

Chapa 
 (Havan Flores) is a girl who debuted in the Henry Danger episode "Game of Phones", asking for help from Captain Man and Kid Danger to find her stolen cell phone, later returning in the series finale "The Fate of Danger", where she gains the ability of electrokinesis. She mentions her full name as Lula Elena Chapa Da Silva in her debut. She becomes one of the main characters in the spinoff Danger Force as a superheroine named Volt. She is often grumpy, and with a violent attitude. She and other characters often make reference to the fact that she doesn't have a cell phone because it was stolen, which she finally gets back in "Chapa's Phone Home".

Miles 
 (Terrence Little Gardenhigh) is the twin brother of Mika, who debuted in the Henry Danger episode "Escape Room", where he tries to get out with Ray, Henry and Mika from an escape room, later returning in the series finale "The Fate of Danger", where he develops the power of teleportation. He becomes one of the main characters in the spinoff Danger Force as a superhero named AWOL. He has a positive and laid-back personality, which often makes him hope that problems will take care of themselves. His last name is revealed to be Macklin in the Danger Force episode "Mika in the Middle". In "Miles Has Visions" he develops a second power, consisting of having visions of the future, although these appear randomly.

Mika  
 (Dana Heath) is the twin sister of Miles, who debuted in the Henry Danger episode "Escape Room", where she tries to get out with Ray, Henry and Miles from an escape room, later returning in the series finale "The Fate of Danger", where she develops the ability of sonic scream (although not revealed until the pilot episode of Danger Force). She becomes one of the main characters in the spinoff Danger Force as a superheroine named ShoutOut. She is shown to be the smarter and more responsible member of Danger Force, though she can lose her temper when it comes to outdoing others when it comes to competing to be the best. Her last name is revealed to be Macklin in the Danger Force episode "Mika in the Middle".

Bose 
 (Luca Luhan) is the ditzy stepson of Vice-Mayor Willard, who helps Captain Man and Kid Danger in the last four episodes of Henry Danger, in the series finale "The Fate of Danger" getting the power of telekinesis. He becomes one of the main characters in the spinoff Danger Force as a superhero named Brainstorm. The main thing that stands out about his personality is that he is not too intelligent, often his companions having to explain things to him carefully. His last name is revealed to be O'Brian in the Danger Force episode "Radioactive Cat".

Recurring

Gooch 
Gooch (Duncan Bravo) is the cashier at "Junk 'n' Stuff", who works with Captain Man. He alerts Captain Man of any dangers in Swellview. He also has a young nephew named Benjy and a pet carnivorous plant named Omar. His last appearance is in the first-season episode "Captain Jerk" as later episodes have his position handled by Jasper.

Mr. Hart / Jake 
Mr. Hart / Jake (Jeffrey Nicholas Brown) is Henry and Piper's father, who works as a project manager. He is described to have a loving, caring, and childish personality. In the final episodes, he learns that Henry is Kid Danger during Drex's latest plot.

Mrs. Hart / Kris 
Mrs. Hart / Kris (Kelly Sullivan) is Henry and Piper's mother. She is oblivious to the fact that Captain Man has a crush on her. In the final episodes, she learns that Henry is Kid Danger during Drex's latest plot as well as her knowledge that Ray likes her.

Sidney 
Sidney (Joe Kaprielian) is a boy who shares similar personality traits with his best friend Oliver.

Oliver Pook 
Oliver Pook (Matthew Zhang) is a strange and quirky boy. He is the best friend of Sydney and shares a similar interest in odd clothing.

Toddler 
Toddler (Ben Giroux) is a dwarfism villain with a baby-motif. He was the first villain that Kid Danger faced with Captain Man. He was defeated upon falling into the bottomless ball pit and a bomb also falling in it.

In "Danger & Thunder," villains like Dr. Minyak and Nurse Cohort, Drill Finger, Jeff, Time Jerker, Van Del, and an unidentified alien woman were gathered together in a base underneath Lake Swellview. An incognito Captain Man, Kid Danger, and Thundergirl discovered that Dr. Minyak did not bring all of them together. It was actually Toddler who survived upon being blasted to the center of the Earth and how he had to tunnel back to the surface and came out of a sandbox. Toddler leads the villains in a plot to get revenge on Captain Man. In addition, he is tended to by Max Thunderman who is secretly planning to obtain Dr. Minyak's latest weapon.

In "The Fate of Danger" Pt. 2, Toddler attends Kid Danger's memorial where he is chained together with Dr. Minyak and Jack Frittleman.

Miss Shapen 
Miss Sharona Shapen (Jill Benjamin) is Henry's history teacher at Swellview Junior High. She is known to ask Henry for advice on dating as she can never get a successful date. In "Double Date Danger", it is revealed that Miss Shapen has a niece named Noelle who worked for Drill Finger.

She is extremely lazy and reluctant to do what she is paid to do, and is far from being a "perfect" teacher, to the point that she can be bribed into giving good marks (in the episode "My Phony Valentine") or can encourage students to cheat in order to have good marks on a teacher evaluation test.

In Danger Force, Miss Shapen was fired from her teaching job at Swellview Junior High and is now working for the city as a school inspector.

Nurse Cohort 
Nurse Cohort (Amber Bela Muse) is the female assistant of Dr. Minyak.

Dr. Minyak 
Dr. Minyak (Mike Ostroki) is a mad scientist villain who is possibly Captain Man's nemesis.

Vice Mayor Willard 
Vice Mayor Willard (Timothy Brennen) is the vice mayor of Swellview.

The episode "Budget Cuts" reveals that he has a niece named Cassie.

In "The Beginning of the End," Willard becomes the stepfather of Bose when he marries Bose's mother. He has Captain Man and Kid Danger watch over Bose in exchange that he will put up a statue of them if they do a good job.

In "The Fate of Danger" Pt. 2, Willard presides over Kid Danger's memorial. He also unveils two statues of Kid Danger. Willard stated that he planned to have a statue of Captain Man, but changed his mind.

Mary Gaperman / Mary 
Mary Gaperman / Mary (Carrie E. Barrett / Carrie Barrett) is the co-anchor of Trent at KLVY. She gets annoyed at Trent when he interrupts or changes the subject on her while speaking on the news.

Trent Overunder / Trent 
Trent Overunder / Trent (Winston Story) is the newsman on KLVY who reports on the activities in Swellview, which include Captain Man's heroic activities.

Jeff 
Jeff (Ryan Grassmeyer) is a dimwitted petty criminal that often gets busted by Captain Man. In "The Whole Bilsky Family" it is revealed that his last name is Bilsky and he is Mitch's older brother. He appeared at the Hart-Bilsky family dinner at the time when Piper was dating his younger brother Billy.

In "The Fate of Danger" Pt. 2, Jeff speaks at Kid Danger's memorial.

Mitch 
Mitch (Andrew Caldwell), commonly referred to by his full name Mitch Bilsky, is a school bully who picks on Henry and others. In "The Whole Bilsky Family", it is revealed that Jeff is his older brother. In Danger Force, He finally graduates high school in Bilsky's Billions.

Bianca 
Bianca (Maeve Tomalty) is Henry's ex-girlfriend. She is a popular girl in Swellview Junior High. Like Chloe, she later become a reality star in the show "Kids in the Woods".

Drex 
Drex (Tommy Walker) is Captain Man's original sidekick who he never let out of the Man Cave. This causes Drex to go rogue and cause havoc resulting in Captain Man defeating him. Years later at Swellview Prison during its "Take Your Daughter to Work Day" event, Drex is accidentally released from prison by the parole board chairman's daughter after she gets into the computer system. Drex begins his plan of revenge against Captain Man and even causes trouble for Kid Danger. In order to defeat Drex, Kid Danger is given new superpowers, who allows Kid Danger to overpower Drex. Drex is imprisoned in the Man Cave.

In "Back to the Danger," Drex is accidentally freed when Vice-Mayor Willard had the power to Swellview shut off for a brief time. Using Time Jerker's time machine, Drex goes back in time to prevent Ray from getting his powers. During the conflict, Drex gets exposed to the same process, gaining the power of invulnerability and a reptilian left hand. Captain Man and Kid Danger are able to send Drex to prehistoric times.

In the final four episodes, Drex has befriended a tribe of cavemen where he swayed them to his side. They froze themselves and then are thawed out due to global warming. Drex begins his revenge on Captain Man and Kid Danger by sending some cavemen to attack Henry at his house while he and two cavemen raided the Man Cave. During this time, his last name is revealed to be Stinkelbaum. Obtaining the Memory Wiper device while tricking Schwoz into making some adjustments, Drex plans to erase Swellview's memories of Captain Man. His plans were thwarted by Captain Man and Kid Danger as the drone that Jasper controls drops Drex off at Swellview Prison. After being blast with the omega weapon in “The Fate of Danger: Part 2”, he is not indestructible anymore, however he still has his left claw hand.

Rick Twitler 
Rick Twittler (David Blue) is the creator of Twitflash and evil genius who seeks to shut down the Internet.

Angela
Angela (Nakia Burrise) is the mother of Mika and Miles

Herman 
Herman (Antonio D. Charity) the father of Mika and Miles.

Celia 
Celia (Siobhan Murphy) is the mother of Bose and wife of Vice Mayor Willard. Like Bose, Celia has a ditzy personality. The episode "Chapa's Phone Home" reveals that Celia is the reason why Bose was responsible for not getting Chapa's phone back to her 8 years ago because Celia didn't want to be late for her date with Vice Mayor Willard.

Archduke Fernando 
Archduke Fernando (Joe Gillette) is the Archduke of the neighbouring town Rivalton.

Minor characters

Chest Monster 
Chest Monster (Pickles Senior), is a monster in a treasure chest that resides in the Man's Nest and gets involved in the Danger Force's situations in addition giving input.

Lil' Dynomite 

Lil' Dynomite (Mitchell Berg) is Captain Man's temporary side kick after the Danger Force don't hang out with him Lil' Dynomite.

Officer Walnut 
Officer Didi Waltnut (Dayna Dooley) is a police officer in Swellview and Minka's and Miles aunt. Her name full name is revealed in Mika's Musical. In the Danger Force Season 2 episode Unmasked, she found out the true identities of the Danger Force.

Notable guest stars

Nathan 
Nathan (Nathan Kress) appears in "Birthday Girl Down".

Shawn 
Shawn (Russell Westbrook) appears in "Too Much Game". He is a young man who Coach Bix gets to pose as a teenager in order to get on his basketball team and replace Henry. Coach Bix holds a basketball match to see who will stay on his basketball team and who will go. Despite Schwoz's gifts, Henry loses and Coach Bix makes Shawn the replacement for Henry for the upcoming championship. Henry later learns from Shawn that Coach Bix had captured his labradoodle in order to get Shawn to cooperate. Upon being informed of this, Captain Man caged up Coach Bix and returned Shawn his labradoodle.

Chloe 
Chloe (Jade Pettyjohn) appears in "Henry the Man-Beast". She is a girl who is one of Henry's love interests. She later stars in the reality show "Kids in the Woods". Chloe's last name is revealed to be Hartman.

Invisible Brad 
Invisible Brad (voiced by Jake Farrow) appears in "Invisible Brad", Grave Danger and Visible Brad. He is a man who was accidentally turned invisible.

Li'l Biggie 
Li'l Biggie (Benjamin Flores, Jr.) appears in "The Beat Goes On". He is a holographic rapper used by Dr. Minyak to brainwash Charlotte.

Time Jerker 
The Time Jerker (Joey Richter) is a manipulator of time, able to escape for long periods of time thanks to his time machine. He first appears in "The Time Jerker", in which Henry is accidentally trapped in a time loop after Captain Man and Kid Danger confront the Time Jerker.

Phoebe Thunderman / Thundergirl 
Phoebe Thunderman (Kira Kosarin) appears in "Danger & Thunder". The character crosses over from The Thundermans. She comes to Swellview to assist Captain Man and Kid Danger while her parents have taken Nora, Billy and Chloe to a theme park. It was mentioned in a discussion between Thundergirl and Captain Man that Thunderman is an old friend of Captain Man.

Max Thunderman 
Max Thunderman (Jack Griffo) appears in "Danger & Thunder". The character crosses over from The Thundermans. He is Phoebe's twin brother. Max goes to Swellview and gets himself into Toddler's gathering of villains in order to get close to Dr. Minyak's latest weapon.

Jack Frittleman 	
Jack Frittleman (Alec Mapa) is the owner of the company Frittles. After his company's headquarters blown up twice, first in "The Trouble with Frittles" and second in "Henry's Frittle Problem", both times because of Henry and Ray, he reappears in "Escape Room" as a villain trying to get revenge.

Frankini 
Frankini (Frankie Grande) appears in "Live & Dangerous: Part 1", "Live & Dangerous: Part 2", "Captain Man-kini", and "Henry Danger: The Musical". He is an Internet celebrity; with the assistance of Goomer, he uses an illegal machine to control Kid Danger and Captain Man and tries to have them unmask themselves when he reaches 10,000,000 viewers. His plot is thwarted due to a blackout. In "Captain Man-kini", Captain Man releases Frankini and Goomer into his custody so that he can temporarily switch bodies with Frankini and get close enough to a plot by another Internet celebrity named GoBro. In "Henry Danger: The Musical", he sets a curse over the town that makes everyone in Swellview sing and dance.

Goomer 
Goomer (Zoran Korach) appears in "Live & Dangerous: Part 1", "Live & Dangerous: Part 2", "Captain Man-kini", and "Henry Danger: The Musical" He is the henchman of Frankini. Goomer mentions to Kid Danger and Captain Man that he used to be associated with Frankini's sister a long time ago. In "Captain Man-kini", Captain Man releases Goomer and Frankini into his custody so that he can temporarily switch bodies with Frankini and get close enough to a plot by another Internet celebrity named GoBro. Before Henry Danger was created, he appears in Sam & Cat where he was a mixed martial artist and a friend of Dice.

Snoop Dogg 
Snoop Dogg appears as himself in "Danger Games".

Shaun White 
Shaun White appears as himself in "Toon in for Danger". He appears at the Hart family home, where the viewing party of the new Kid Danger and Captain Man cartoon is being held.

Joey 
Joey (Jerry Trainor) appears in "Thumb War". He is one of the Thumb Buddies. He mentions to Kid Danger and Captain Man that he has a sister who speaks with a lisp.

Arc 
Arc (Owen Joyner) appears in "Knight & Danger". The character crosses over from Knight Squad. After being transported to Swellview from his dimension, he and Ciara helps Captain Man and Kid Danger stop Ryker.

Ciara 
Ciara (Daniella Perkins) appears in "Knight & Danger". The character crosses over Knight Squad. After being transported to Swellview from her dimension, she and Arc helps Captain Man and Kid Danger stop Ryker.

Ryker 
Ryker (Geno Segers) appears in "Knight & Danger". The character crosses over Knight Squad. He is the former ruler of Astoria from another reality who was accidentally brought to Captain Man's reality by Bill Evil following his last attempt to take over Astoria. While finding out that his magic doesn't work in this reality, Ryker tricked Captain Man and Kid Danger in helping him obtain weapons and getting back to his world. His plans are thwarted when Arc and Ciara reveal his true motives.

Deuce Van Nuys 

Deuce Van Nuys (Mike Caron) is a movie director in Hollywood that hires the Danger Force to protect a movie witch turns out to be fake.

That Girl Lay Lay
That Girl Lay Lay (That Girl Lay Lay), is a movie star in Hollywood

Notes

References

General references 
 The episodes of Henry Danger and Danger Force that have aired are the source of most of the information in this article.

Lists of American comedy television series characters
Lists of Nickelodeon television series characters